Willie Ríos (born 11 February 1949) is a Puerto Rican middle-distance runner. He competed in the men's 1500 metres at the 1968 Summer Olympics.

References

1949 births
Living people
Athletes (track and field) at the 1968 Summer Olympics
Puerto Rican male middle-distance runners
Olympic track and field athletes of Puerto Rico
Sportspeople from San Juan, Puerto Rico